Edward Lowe or Eddie Lowe may refer to:
 Edward Lowe (composer) (c. 1610–1682), organist, composer and Oxford professor of music
 Edward Low or Edward Lowe (1690–1724), English pirate
 Edward Löwe (1794–1880), also Loewe or Lowe, English chess master
 Edward Clarke Lowe (1823–1912), English educator
 Edward Joseph Lowe (1825–1900), English botanist
 Edward T. Lowe Jr. (1880-1973), American film producer & writer
 Ed Lowe (businessman) (1920–1995), American businessman and inventor of cat litter
 Eddie Lowe (footballer) (1925–2009), English football player and manager
 Ed Lowe (journalist) (1946–2011), American newspaper columnist
 Eddie Lowe (Canadian football) (born 1960), American politician and former linebacker in the Canadian Football League

See also
 Ted Lowe (1920–2011), English snooker commentator